The Ministry for Chieftaincy and Traditional Affairs is the official Ghanaian agency responsible the creation of linkages between the Government of Ghana and the traditional authorities in the country. Based on recommendations by the African Peer Review Mechanism and the citizenry the Jerry John Rawlings administration established the ministry to address the recommendations. The Ministry was set up in 1993 and is backed by the Civil Service Law, 1993 (PNDC Law 327). Prior to its establishment, its functions were performed by two agencies namely the Chieftaincy Division Secretariat under the Office of the President and the Culture Division under the National Commission on Culture.

Organizations under the ministry

Houses of Chiefs
1 National
10 Regional
196 Traditional Councils

National Commission on Culture
1 National Secretariat
10 Regional Offices
138 District Offices

Bureau of Ghana Languages (BGL)

Ghana Museums and Monuments Board (GMMB)

National Theatre of Ghana
National Theatre Company of Ghana
National Symphony Orchestra
National Dance Company

National Folklore Board

Kwame Nkrumah Memorial Park

W. E. B. Du Bois Memorial Centre for Pan African Culture

Pan African Writers' Association (PAWA)

Affiliated organizations

Institutions
College of Art and Social Sciences, Kwame Nkrumah University of Science and Technology (KNUST), Kumasi
School of Performing Arts, University of Ghana, Legon
Institute of African Studies, University of Ghana, Legon
Centre for Cultural and African Studies, KNUST, Kumasi
Department of Archaeology, University of Ghana, Legon

Associations (Arts)
Ghana Association of Visual Artists (GAVA)
Musicians Union of Ghana (MUSIGA)
Ghana Union of Theatre Association (GHATA)
Ghana Association of Writers (GAW)
Ghana Dance Association (GDA)
Ghana Concert Parties Union (GCPU)
Ghana Culture Forum (GCF)

Relations with international bodies
UNESCO
KwaZulu Natal Provincial Government South Africa
The British Museum, U.K.
African, Caribbean and Pacific Countries (ACP)

Vision
The vision of this Ministry is to preserve, sustain and integrate the regal, traditional and cultural values and practices to accelerate wealth creation and harmony for total national development.

Mission
Its mission is to educate chiefs on Government of Ghana's policies for good governance, conflict resolutions among the various cultural groupings. Also by supporting the various chieftaincy and cultural institutions administratively, financially and review the various chieftaincy and cultural legal framework to conform to international best practices.

Objectives
The objectives of this Ministry are to:
 Provide institutional capacity to the departments and agencies under the Ministry for efficient, effective and sustainable service delivery.
 Formulate and supervise the implementation of national and sectoral policies and programmes
 Promote political tolerance and national stability through the mediums of the arts and diplomacy.
 Promote public and internal relationship within the sectors of chieftaincy and culture
 Monitor and evaluate activities of the Chieftaincy and Culture Sectors.

Functions
The Ministry performs the following functions:
 Initiate, formulate and ensure the efficient and effective implementation of policies, plans, programmes and projects for the sectors.
 Preserve, conserve, develop, promote and present Ghanaian heritage institutions, arts, architecture, cultural sites and values to project the unique Ghanaian identity and national pride.
 Co-ordinate, monitor and evaluate the performance of the institutions and affiliated associations within the Sectors and devise appropriate strategies for improving performance delivery of each organisation.
 Organise periodic Sectoral Review Conferences for all stakeholders in the Ministry to re–examine the direction and focus of the Ministry in line with prevailing Government policies to help update sector policies, plans, programmes and projects.

See also
Government of Ghana
UNESCO
KwaZulu Natal
Musicians Union of Ghana

References

 
Ministries and Agencies of State of Ghana